2000 Emmy Awards may refer to:

 52nd Primetime Emmy Awards, the 2000 Emmy Awards ceremony honoring primetime programming June 1999 – May 2000
 27th Daytime Emmy Awards, the 2000 Emmy Awards ceremony honoring daytime programming during 1999
 38th International Emmy Awards, honoring international programming

Emmy Award ceremonies by year